Stelis superbiens is an orchid of the genus Stelis.

It has stems of ½ inch triangular two-toned red flowers with shiny backs line up alternately on straight stems - 6 to 8 inch plant - spectacular show - blooms several times a year. Mature.

References 

superbiens